Abderrahim Deghmoum (born 2 December 1998 in Beni Aziz) is an Algerian footballer who plays for Al Masry SC.

Career
On 24 April 2018 Deghmoum made his professional debut for Sétif as a substitute against Paradou AC.
In 2022, he joined Al Masry SC.

References

External links
 

1998 births
Algerian footballers
Algerian Ligue Professionnelle 1 players
ES Sétif players
People from Sétif Province
Living people
Association football midfielders
21st-century Algerian people